ABC Radio is the first news-oriented FM radio station in Bangladesh. ABC Radio is part of Mediastar Limited of Transcom Limited. It is a sister concern of Transcom Group along with the daily Prothom Alo. The studio is located in the media area of Karwan Bazar.

The Head of Operations is Kabir Bakul, while the Head of Programs is Sagar Shahriar. The station broadcasts 24 hours at FM 89.2  from Dhaka. ABC launched its commercial operation on 7 January 2009.

News
ABC Radio collaborates with nationally published daily Prothom-alo. It gets support from 250 correspondents countrywide. It has overseas correspondents in India, USA, UK and Japan.

It offers hourly short bulletins, with six Bangla prime news bulletins.

Coverage 
The broadcasts cover about 33 million people living in Dhaka, Chittagong and Cox's Bazar stations. 
 Dhaka
 Narayanganj
 Gazipur
 Manikganj
 Narsingdi
 Madaripur
 Shariatpur
 Faridpur
 Chittagong
 Cox's Bazar
 Bandarban
 Khagrachhari
 Rangamati
 Feni
 Noakhali

References

External links

Android App

Radio stations in Bangladesh
Mass media in Dhaka
Radio stations established in 2007